The 2004 RTHK Top 10 Gold Songs Awards was held in 2004 for the 2003 music season.

Top 10 song awards
The top 10 songs (十大中文金曲) of 2003 are as follows. This year only 9 songs were awarded.

Other awards

References
 RTHK top 10 gold song awards 2004

RTHK Top 10 Gold Songs Awards
Rthk Top 10 Gold Songs Awards, 2004
Rthk Top 10 Gold Songs Awards, 2004